Blaslay is a former commune in the Vienne department in the Nouvelle-Aquitaine region in western France. On 1 January 2017, it was merged into the new commune Saint-Martin-la-Pallu.

See also
Communes of the Vienne department

References

Former communes of Vienne